Settlement Prolet is situated in the center of the city Skopje, capital of North Macedonia. It was built in 1947 and it is the first apartment settlement built after the World War II. It is located in the Centar municipality and is one of the smallest settlements in the whole city. The handball team called RK Tineks Prolet founded in 1962 is the pride of the settlement.

Neighbourhoods of Skopje